Pleradenophora is a plant genus of the family Euphorbiaceae.

Species include:

References 

Hippomaneae
Euphorbiaceae genera